The Rauma is a river that runs through Romsdalen, a valley in Møre og Romsdal and Innlandet counties in Norway. The river was once famous for its salmon-fishing, but since an infection with Gyrodactylus salaris only 5 to 10% of the original stock survives. This, however, has begun to recover rapidly after a successful revitalisation project.

The Rauma River and its valley are regarded as one of the most beautiful in Norway. The Reinheimen National Park and the Trollveggen cliff are both located along the southwestern shores of the river through the municipality of Rauma. The Romsdalsalpene mountains surround the river and the valley, including the mountains Store Trolltind, Store Venjetinden, Trollryggen, and Romsdalshornet. The Rauma Line railroad follows the river through the valley on its way north to Åndalsnes. The railroad crosses the river on the Kylling Bridge at the village of Verma.

The Rauma was classified as a protected watercourse in 1992, and the only main tributary affected by hydroelectric power is the Verma River with the over  Vermafossen falls. The biggest tributaries are the Ulvåa and Istra. The Istra runs through the Ister Valley, well known for Trollstigen Road in its upper parts.

The origins of the name Rauma are unknown.

Media gallery

References

External links

Rauma, Norway
Rivers of Innlandet
Rivers of Møre og Romsdal